TMPDIR is the canonical environment variable in Unix and POSIX that should be used to specify a temporary directory for scratch space.

Other forms sometimes accepted are TEMP, TEMPDIR and TMP, but these alternatives are used more commonly by non-POSIX operating systems or non-conformant programs.

TMPDIR is specified in various Unix and similar standards, e.g. per the Single UNIX Specification.

See also
 Filesystem Hierarchy Standard
 mktemp
 Temporary folder
 Unix filesystem

References

Unix file system technology
Environment variables